For a List of Donald Trump 2020 presidential campaign endorsements, see:

 List of Donald Trump 2020 presidential campaign political endorsements
 List of Donald Trump 2020 presidential campaign non-political endorsements